Shlemiel the First can refer to:

 A short story by Isaac Bashevis Singer, part of a series of stories about a fool named "Shlemiel"
 Shlemiel the First (musical) - a musical theatre adaptation of stories by Singer, set to klezmer music